This is a list of American women's firsts, noting the first time that an American woman or women achieved a given historical feat. Inclusion on the list is reserved for achievements by American women that have significant historical impact.

17th century 
1635
Anne Hutchinson was the first American woman to start a Protestant sect.
1640
Anne Bradstreet was the first published poet in the British North American colonies.
1647
Margaret Brent was the first American woman to demand the right to vote.
1649
Sarah White Norman and Mary Vincent Hammon were charged with "lewd behavior upon a bed." They are the first American women convicted of lesbian activity.

18th century
1700s
Henrietta Johnston was the first known female portrait painter in the American colonies as well as the first woman pastelist.
1739
Elizabeth Timothy was the first woman to print a formal newspaper as well as the first female franchise holder in the colonies. 
1750
Jane Colden was the first woman botanist in America.
1756
Lydia Taft was the first woman known to vote legally in Colonial America after her husband died and son left her; she was granted permission to vote through a Massachusetts town meeting.
1762
Ann Smith Franklin was the first female newspaper editor in America.
1776
Margaret Corbin was the first woman to assume the role of soldier in the American Revolutionary War and receive a pension for it.
1784
Hannah Adams was the first American woman to become a professional writer.
Hannah Slater was the first American woman granted a patent.

19th century

1800s 
1808
Jane Aitken was the first American woman to print the Bible in English.

1810s 
1812
Lucy Brewer was one of the first American women to join the United States Marine Corps.

1820s 
1828
Sarah Hale was the first American woman to become editor of a major women's magazine (Godey's Lady's Book).

1830s 
1835
Harriot Kezia Hunt was one of the first American women to practice medicine professionally, and "clearly the first to achieve a marked success".

1840s 
1840
Dorothy Catherine Draper was the first woman to be photographed.
1846
Sarah Bagley was the first woman in America to become a telegraph operator.
Frances Whitcher was the first significant female comic protagonist in America, and the "first best-selling woman humorist".
1848
Maria Mitchell was the first female astronomer in the United States as well as the first woman elected to the American Academy of Arts and Sciences.
1849
Elizabeth Blackwell, born in England, was the first woman to earn a medical degree in America.

1850s 

1850
Harriet Tubman was the first American woman to run an underground railroad to help slaves escape. Some scholars label her the "Queen of the Underground Railroad".
1853
Antoinette Brown Blackwell was the first woman ordained as a minister in America; she was ordained by the Congregational Church. 
1855
Anne McDowell was the first American woman to publish a newspaper completely run by women; it was circulated weekly and titled, "Women's Advocate".
Emeline Roberts Jones was the first woman to practice dentistry in the United States. She married the dentist Daniel Jones when she was a teenager, and became his assistant in 1855.

1860s 
1865
Mary Surratt was the first woman executed by the federal government of the United States; she was hanged for conspiring with John Wilkes Booth in the assassination of Abraham Lincoln.
1866
Mary Walker was the first woman in America to receive the Congressional Medal of Honor.
1866
Lucy Hobbs Taylor was the first woman in America to graduate from a dental school (Ohio College of Dental Surgery).
1869
Arabella Mansfield was the first American woman to become a professional lawyer; she was admitted to the Iowa bar.

1870s 

1870
Louisa Swain was the first woman in the United States to vote in a general election, after the women of New Jersey lost the right to vote in 1807; she cast her ballot on September 6th, 1870, in Laramie, Wyoming.
1870
Esther Hobart Morris was the first woman in America to serve as Justice of the peace.
1870
Ada Kepley was the first woman to graduate from law school in America (Northwestern University School of Law).
1871
Frances Willard was the first American woman college president. She also presided over the Women's Christian Temperance Union
1872
Victoria Woodhull was the first woman to run for President of the United States.
1873
Ellen Swallow Richards was one of first American women to become a professional chemist and first to earn a degree in Chemistry; she was the first woman to graduate from school of science or technology in America (Massachusetts Institute of Technology).
1876
Louise Blanchard Bethune was the first American woman to become a professional architect.
1877
Helen Magill White was the first woman in America to earn the Ph.D. degree (in Greek).
1878
Emma Abbott was the first American woman to form her own opera company.

1880s 
1880
Belva Ann Lockwood was the first woman to argue a case before the Supreme Court of the United States.
Mary Myers, a balloonist, who was the first woman to fly solo - done 4 July 1880 at Little Falls, New York.
1887
Susanna M. Salter was elected mayor of Argonia, Kansas becoming the first woman mayor in the United States.
Phoebe Couzins was the first American woman to serve as a United States Marshal.

1890s 
1890
Amanda Theodosia Jones established the first all-women's company, called Women's Canning and Preserving Company
1891
Marie Owens, born in Canada, was hired as America's first female police officer, joining the Chicago Police Department.
Irene Williams Coit, was the first woman passing the Yale College entrance examination.
1892
Wilhelmina Weber Furlong was the first American woman Modernist studio painter from the early American Modernism scene in Manhattan, New York
1893
Florence Kelley was the first woman to hold statewide office when Governor John Peter Altgeld appointed her Chief Factory Inspector for the state of Illinois. 
1896
May Irwin was the first actress in America to kiss on screen, which she did in the film The Kiss.
1899
Eleonora de Cisneros was the first American trained opera singer the Metropolitan Opera company hired.

20th century

1900s 

1900
Margaret Abbott was the first American woman to win an Olympic event (women's golf tournament at the 1900 Paris Games); she was the first American woman, and the second woman overall to do it. 
Carro Clark was the first American woman to establish, own and manage a book publishing firm (The C. M. Clark Company opened in Boston).
1905
May Sutton was the first American woman to win Wimbledon.
1907
 Dorothy Tyler was the first known American woman jockey.
1908
Lola Baldwin was the first known woman performing duties as police officer in the United States;  she worked at Portland Police Bureau until 1922.
The first Mother's Day was observed; Anna Jarvis is noted as the driving force for recognition of this holiday.
The first U.S. Navy nurses, known as the Sacred Twenty, were appointed; they were all women, and were the first women to formally serve in the U.S. Navy.
Poet Julia Ward Howe was the first woman elected to the American Academy of Arts and Letters.
1909
Carolyn B. Shelton became the first woman to serve as acting governor of a U.S. state; she performed the duties as governor of Oregon just over the weekend in absence of both outgoing and incoming full-time governor.

1910s 
1910
Alice Stebbins Wells was the first American-born woman sworn in as a police officer, which she did at Los Angeles Police Department.
Florence Lawrence was America's first movie star.
1911
Harriet Quimby was the first woman licensed as an airplane pilot in America.
Clara Elizabeth Chan Lee was the first Chinese American woman to register to vote in the United States; she registered to vote on November 8, 1911 in California following the passage of 1911 California Proposition 4, nine years before the passage of the Nineteenth Amendment to the United States Constitution.
1912 
Girl Guides of America (now Girl Scouts of the USA) was established as the first voluntary organization for girls.
1914
Caresse Crosby was the first woman to patent a brassiere.
1916
Margaret Sanger opened the first birth control clinic in the United States.
 November 7 - Jeannette Rankin became the first woman elected to a national office; she represented Montana as the first woman in the U.S. House of Representatives or either chamber of U.S. Congress.
1917
Loretta Perfectus Walsh was the first woman to enlist in the U.S. Navy.
1918
Annette Abbott Adams was the first woman to serve as Assistant Attorney General, "...the highest judicial position any woman in the world had ever held".
Opha May Johnson was the first woman to enlist in the United States Marines.
Twin sisters Genevieve and Lucille Baker of the Naval Coastal Defense Reserve were the first uniformed women to serve in the United States Coast Guard.
Sara Teasdale was the first woman to win the Pulitzer Prize for Poetry (for her collection Love Songs)

1920s 

1920
Marie Luhring was the first woman in America to become an automotive engineer.
1921
Edith Wharton was the first woman to win the Pulitzer Prize for Fiction (for her novel The Age of Innocence).
Margaret Gorman was the first winner of Miss America beauty pageant.Lurie, Maxine N., and Marc Mappen (2004). Encyclopedia of New Jersey. New Brunswick, N.J.: Rutgers University Press.
 June 20 - Alice Mary Robertson became the first woman to preside over the U.S. House of Representatives or either chamber of U.S. Congress; however, she was opposed to women's suffrage.
Zona Gale was the first woman to win the Pulitzer Prize for Drama (for her play Miss Lulu Bett)
1922
 November 21 - Rebecca Latimer Felton became the first woman to serve in the U.S. Senate; she appointed by the state governor to represent Georgia, although she served for only one day.
1923
Florence King became the first woman to win a case before the U.S. Supreme Court (Crown v. Nye).
1923
Ella Lillian Wall Van Leer became the first woman to serve in an office of the American Legion and would later successfully advocate for women to be admitted into Georgia Tech.
1924 
Juliana R. Force was the first woman to present folk art in an official public showing exhibition in America.
1925
Nellie Tayloe Ross became the first woman elected governor of a U.S. state; she nominated for the unexpired term as governor of Wyoming upon the death of her husband.
An All-Woman Supreme Court in Texas, the first woman-majority state Supreme Court in U.S. history, sits for a five-month special sitting on a single case, disbanding shortly afterward. 
1926
Gertrude Ederle was the first woman to swim across the English Channel.
1928
Amelia Earhart was the first woman to fly across the Atlantic ocean.
Genevieve R. Cline was the first woman appointed as a United States federal judge.

 1930s 

1930
Ellen Church was the first female flight attendant in America; she suggested the idea of female nurses on board to Boeing Air Transport, claiming that if people felt safer they would fly more.
1931
Jane Addams was the first American woman to win the Nobel Peace Prize; she shared the prize with Nicholas Murray Butler.
1932
Hattie Caraway was the first woman elected to the U.S. Senate.
1933
Ruth Bryan Owen became the first woman ever to serve as a chief of mission at the minister rank, and as such the first woman to serve as minister to Denmark and Iceland; she served under President Franklin D. Roosevelt.
Frances Perkins became the first woman ever to serve in a presidential cabinet, and as such the first woman to serve as Secretary of Labor; she served under President Franklin D. Roosevelt.
1934
Gertrude Atherton was the first woman to be president of the (American) National Academy of Literature.
Lettie Pate Whitehead was the first woman to serve as a director of a major corporation (The Coca-Cola Company).
 1935

Kate Galt Zaneis was the first woman to lead a state college or university in the United States when she became president of Southeastern Oklahoma State Teachers College.
1937
Grace Hudowalski was the ninth person and first woman to climb all 46 of the Adirondack High Peaks. 
1938
Pearl S. Buck was the first American woman to win the Nobel Prize in Literature.
1939
Molly Kool was North America's first registered female sea captain or ship master.

 1940s 

1940s
Lois Fegan Farrell was the first female reporter to cover a professional hockey team in America.
1942
Anna Leah Fox was the first woman to receive the Purple Heart, which she received for being wounded in the attack on Pearl Harbor.
Mildred H. McAfee was the first woman commissioned in the U.S. Naval Reserve and the first woman to receive the Navy Distinguished Service Medal
1943
Nellie Neilson was the first woman to serve as president of the American Historical Association.
Edith Ellen Greenwood was the first woman to receive the Soldier's Medal.
1944
Cordelia E Cook was the first woman to receive both the Bronze Star Medal and the Purple Heart.
Ann Baumgartner was the first woman to fly a jet aircraft, the Bell YP-59A on October 14, 1944.
1946
Frances Xavier Cabrini was the first American canonized by the Roman Catholic church as a saint.
1947
Gerty Cori was the first woman to win the Nobel Prize in Physiology or Medicine; she shared the prize with Carl Ferdinand Cori and Bernardo Alberto Houssay. Although born in Prague, Gerty Cori is considered the first American woman to win a Nobel Prize in medicine. She had become a U.S. citizen in 1928.
1948
Esther McGowin Blake was the first woman in the U.S. Air Force. She enlisted in the first minute of the first hour of the first day regular Air Force duty was authorized for women on July 8th, 1948.
1949
Georgia Neese Clark Gray was the first woman Treasurer of the United States; she served under President Harry Truman.
Eugenie Anderson became the first woman ever to serve as a chief of mission at the ambassador rank, and as such the first woman to serve as United States Ambassador to Denmark; she served under President Harry S. Truman.
Shirley Dinsdale was the first recipient of the Emmy Award.
Sara Christian was the first woman to compete in a major-league stock car race, competing in NASCAR's inaugural Strictly Stock (now NASCAR Cup Series) event.

 1950s 

1950
On May 12, Emma Bailey held an auction in Brattleboro, Vermont, becoming the first American woman auctioneer.
1951
Maryly Van Leer Peck became Vanderbilt University's first chemical engineer graduate. Peck also became the first woman to receive an M.S. and a Ph.D. in chemical engineering from the University of Florida. Later she became the first female member of Tau Beta Pi, the oldest engineering honor society. Peck later became the first woman to be named president of any of Florida's community colleges.
1951
December 16: Anna Der-Vartanian became the U.S. Navy's first female master chief petty officer; this made her the first female master chief in the Navy, as well as the first female E-9 in the entire U.S. Armed Services. She received a personal letter from then-President Dwight D. Eisenhower congratulating her on her accomplishment.
1951
Paula Ackerman was the first woman in America to perform rabbinical functions.
Arie Taylor became the first black person to become a U.S. Women's Air Force classroom instructor.
Helen E. Myers of Lancaster, Pa., a 1941 graduate of Temple University, was commissioned as the U.S. Army Dental Corps' first woman dental officer.
1953

Fae Adams was the first female to receive regular commission as a doctor in the United States Army.
Oveta Culp Hobby became the first woman to serve as Secretary of Health, Education, and Welfare; she served under President Dwight D. Eisenhower.
Toni Stone, also known by her married name Marcenia Lyle Alberga, was the first of three women to play Negro league baseball, and thus the first woman to play as a regular on an American big-league professional baseball team.
Ruby Bradley, upon leaving Korea, was given a full-dress honor guard ceremony, the first woman ever to receive a national or international guard salute.
 1954
Jewel Prestage, first African-American woman to complete a doctorate in political science in the United States.
1955
 Betty Robbins, born in Greece, was the first female cantor (hazzan) in the 5,000-year-old history of Judaism. She was appointed cantor of the reform Temple Avodah in Oceanside, New York in 1955,  when she was 31 and the Temple was without a cantor for the High Holidays.
 Clotilde Dent Bowen became the U.S. Army's first black female physician to attain the rank of colonel.
1956
Tenley Albright was the first woman in America to win the Olympic gold medal in figure skating.
1957Decoy: Police Woman was the first television show to feature a female police officer, and in fact the first built around a female protagonist.
1959
Arlene Pieper became the first woman to officially finish a marathon in the United States when she finished the Pikes Peak Marathon in Manitou Springs, Colorado, in 1959.

 1960s 

Wilma L. Vaught became the first woman to deploy with a Strategic Air Command operational unit.
1960
Master Gunnery Sergeant Geraldine M. Moran became the first female Marine promoted to E-9.
1961
The first female U.S. Marine to be promoted to Sergeant Major (Bertha Peters Billeb).
Jacqueline Bouvier Kennedy began her role as the first Catholic First Lady of the United States.
1962
Pearl Faurie became the first SPAR in the U.S. Coast Guard advanced to E-9.
Judy Garland became the first woman to win Album of the Year at the Grammy Awards, winning for Judy at Carnegie Hall. She was also the first woman to win the Golden Globe Cecil B. DeMille Award.
1963
Maria Goeppert Mayer was the first American woman to win a Nobel Prize in Physics; she shared the prize with Eugene Paul Wigner and J. Hans D. Jensen. She was born in Poland, but became a U.S. citizen in 1933. 
 Sarah T. Hughes was the first and only woman to swear in the President of the United States
1964
 Jerrie Mock was the first woman to fly solo around the world, which she did in a Cessna 180. The trip ended April 17, 1964, in Columbus, Ohio, and took 29 days, 21 stopovers and almost 22,860 miles. 
Carol Doda was the first woman in America to perform as a topless entertainer.
Isabel Benham was the first female partner in R.W. Pressprich & Co.'s 55-year history, which also made her the first female partner at any Wall Street bond house.
1964
Alice K. Kurashige became the first Japanese-American woman commissioned in the United States Marine Corps.
1965
Rachel Henderlite was the first woman ordained in the Presbyterian Church in the United States; she was ordained by the Hanover Presbytery in Virginia.
1966
Roberta Louise "Bobbi" Gibb was the first woman to run the entire Boston Marathon. 
1967
Victorine du Pont Homsey was the first woman elected as a Fellow of the American Institute of Architects.
Kathrine Switzer was the first woman to run the Boston Marathon as a numbered entry.
Muriel Siebert was the first female member of the New York Stock Exchange.
1969
Carol Doda was the first woman in America to perform as a bottomless entertainer.

 1970s 

1970
Diane Crump was the first woman in America to ride in the Kentucky Derby, she placed fifteenth.
Patricia Palinkas was the first woman to play professionally in an American football game.
1972
Alene Duerk becomes the first woman to obtain the rank of rear admiral in the U.S. Navy.
Anna Mae Hays and Elizabeth P. Hoisington were the first women in the United States promoted to brigadier general.
Sally Priesand was ordained on June 3rd, 1972, by the Hebrew Union College-Jewish Institute of Religion's president Rabbi Alfred Gottschalk at Plum Street Temple in Cincinnati, making her the first woman ordained as a rabbi in the United States, and only the second woman ever formally ordained in the history of Judaism.
Katharine Graham was the first female Fortune 500 CEO, as CEO of the Washington Post company.
Tonie Nathan was the first woman in America to receive an electoral vote for vice president in a presidential election.
1973
Shirley Muldowney was the first woman to receive a NHRA license to drive Top Fuel dragsters, the highest level of the drag racing sport.
1974
Jeannette Piccard was the first female balloon pilot licensed in the United States; she was also the first woman to ascend to the stratosphere.
Ella T. Grasso was the first woman elected a U.S. governor who was not the wife or widow of a governor. She was elected governor of Connecticut.
1975
Barbara Ostfeld-Horowitz was the first female cantor ordained in Reform Judaism, in 1975.
Carla Anderson Hills became the first woman to serve as Secretary of Housing and Urban Development; she served under President Gerald Ford.
Alice Rivlin became founder and the first woman to serve as Director of the Congressional Budget Office (CBO).
1976
 Shirley Black, aka Shirley Temple, was the first woman to be chief of protocol, which she was for President Gerald Ford.
 Lucy Giovinco was the first female in America to win the AMF Bowling World Cup.
 Women first began to attend the U.S. service academies. 
 Shirley Muldowney was the first woman to win a NHRA national event.
 Emily Howell Warner was the first woman to become an American airline captain.
1977
Janet Guthrie was the first woman to compete in the Daytona 500 and the first woman to lead a NASCAR Winston Cup Series race.
Janet Guthrie was the first woman to compete in the Indianapolis 500, event.
Shirley Muldowney was the first woman to win a NHRA championship, in the Top Fuel category.
Barbara McClintock was the first woman to win an unshared Nobel Prize in Physiology or Medicine, and since she was American, she was the first American woman to do so.
Juanita M. Kreps became the first woman to serve as Secretary of Commerce; she served under President Jimmy Carter.
1978
 January 25 - Muriel Humphrey Brown was the first and only former Second Lady of the United States to serve in the U.S. Congress; she appointed by the state governor to represent Minnesota in the U.S. Senate to succeed her late husband, making her the first woman to hold that office.
Marcia Frederick, at the age of fifteen, was the first woman in America to win World gold in gymnastics.
Mary E. Clarke was the first woman to achieve the rank of major general in the United States Army.
Nancy Teeters became the first woman to serve on the Federal Reserve Board of Governors.
1979
Susan B. Anthony was the first woman in America depicted on a coin.
 August 3 - Patricia Roberts Harris became the first woman and first person of color to serve multiple posts in a presidential cabinet; she appointed Secretary of Housing and Urban Development and Secretary of Health and Human Services serving under President Jimmy Carter.
 November 30 - Shirley Hufstedler became the first woman to serve as Secretary of Education; she served under President Jimmy Carter.

 1980s 

1981

Sandra Day O'Connor became the first woman to serve as Associate Justice of the Supreme Court of the United States, and as such the first woman ever to sit on the U.S. Supreme Court.
 1982
Karen N. Horn became the first woman ever to serve as president of any of the 12 Federal Reserve Banks, and as such the first woman to serve as president of the Federal Reserve Bank of Cleveland.
Leah Lowenstein was the first woman dean of a co-educational medical school in the United States.
1983
Elizabeth Dole became the first woman to serve as Secretary of Transportation; she served under President Ronald Reagan.
Sally Ride was the first American woman in space.
Vanessa L. Williams was the first African-American winner of the Miss America pageant (Miss America 1984). 
Linda Foust was the first woman to drive in the U.S. Presidential motorcade as an Army non-commissioned officer. 
1984
Velma Barfield became the first woman in the United States to be executed after the 1976 resumption of capital punishment and the first since 1962. and the first woman executed by lethal injection.
Geraldine Ferraro was the first woman in America to run for vice president on a major-party platform.
Joan Benoit won the first women's Olympic marathon.
Kathryn D. Sullivan was the first American woman to conduct a spacewalk. 
1985
Penny Harrington  was appointed as Chief of Police in Portland, Oregon, making her the first woman to lead a major-city police department.
Libby Riddles was the first woman to win the Iditarod.
1986
Ann Bancroft was the first woman to reach the North Pole by foot and dogsled, "...she became the first known woman to cross the ice to the North Pole."
Nancy Lieberman joined the United States Basketball League (USBL), thus becoming the first woman to play in a men's professional basketball league.
1987
Aretha Franklin was the first woman inducted into the Rock and Roll Hall of Fame.
1988
Dr. Lenora Fulani was the first female (and first African-American) presidential candidate to secure ballot access in all 50 states; she also secured the most votes ever gained by a female candidate in a presidential election until 2012. 
Shawna Robinson was the first woman to win a NASCAR-sanctioned stock car race, winning in the Charlotte/Daytona Dash Series at New Asheville Speedway.

 1990s 
1990
Jennifer York was the first woman to form a Christian rock band and the first such band that was all-female, Rachel Rachel.
1991
Geraldine Morrow was the first female president of the American Dental Association.
Minnesota's Supreme Court became the first woman-majority state supreme court that was appointed and sat for a regular session. 
1992
Manon Rhéaume was the first woman to play in a National Hockey League game; although she was Canadian, "She played goalie for the Tampa Bay Lightning..."
Mona Van Duyn was the first woman named US poet laureate.
1993
Hazel R. O'Leary became the first woman to serve as Secretary of Energy; she served under President Bill Clinton.
Halli Reid was the first woman to swim across Lake Erie, swimming from Long Point, Ontario, to North East, Pennsylvania, in 17 hours.
Janet Reno became the first woman to serve as Attorney General; she served under President Bill Clinton.
Sheila Widnall became the first woman ever to serve as leader of a branch of the United States Armed Forces, and as such the first woman to serve as Secretary of the Air Force; she served under President Bill Clinton.
1994
Beverly Harvard became first black female police chief of a major city (Atlanta, Georgia)  in the United States.
Judith Rodin was the first permanent female president of an Ivy League University (specifically, the University of Pennsylvania.) 
Alice Rivlin became the first woman to serve as Director of the Office of Management and Budget; she served under President Bill Clinton.
1995
Eileen Collins was the female pilot for the Space Shuttle (on STS-63). (see 1999—first female Shuttle commander)
Roberta Cooper Ramo was the first female President of the American Bar Association.
1996
Alice Rivlin became the first woman to serve as Vice Chair of the Federal Reserve.
1997
Madeleine Albright, born in Prague, became the first woman to serve as Secretary of State; she served under President Bill Clinton.
Liz Heaston was the first woman to play and score in a college football game, kicking two extra points in the 1997 Linfield vs. Willamette football game.
Nancy Dickey was the first female president of the American Medical Association.
Hazel J. Harper was the first female president of the National Dental Association.Hazel Harper, DDS, MPH Inside Dentistry. February 2012. Volume 8, Issue 2.
Janet Rosenberg Jagan was the first American woman elected as a head of state, head of government, and commander-in-chief of a nation's armed forces, taking the role of the President of the Co‑operative Republic of Guyana.
1998
Julie Taymor was the first woman to win a Tony award for best director of a musical.
Fannie Gaston-Johansson was the first African American woman tenured full professor at Johns Hopkins University.
1999
Eileen Collins was the first female commander of a Space Shuttle mission (on STS-93). (see 1995—first female Shuttle pilot)
Carly Fiorina was the first woman to lead a Fortune 50 company (Hewlett-Packard) Carly Fiorina became the first female CEO of a Fortune 20 company.

 21st century 
2000s

2000
Spring - Kathleen A. McGrath became the first woman to command a U.S. Navy warship at sea. 
June 1 - Deborah Walsh became the first woman in the U.S. Coast Guard promoted to Chief Warrant officer in Aviation Engineering (AVI).
July 1 - Regina Mills became the U.S. Navy's first female Aviation Deck LDO.
July - Lucille "Pam" Thompson became the first African-American woman to serve as a U.S. Coast Guard Special Agent; she served in this capacity until July 2004
Fall - General Janet E. A. Hicks was promoted to Brigadier General, becoming the first female one-star general who would later be promoted to Major General in 2002, also becoming the first two-star mother and the first female Commanding General of Ft. Gordon in Augusta, Georgia.
2001
January 3 - Hillary Clinton was the first and only former First Lady of the United States to serve in the U.S. Congress; she elected to represent New York in the U.S. Senate, making her the first woman to hold that office.
January 20 - Ann Veneman became the first woman to serve as Secretary of Agriculture; she served under President George W. Bush.
January 31 - Gale Norton became the first woman to serve as Secretary of the Interior; she served under President George W. Bush.
Stephanie Ready was the first female coach of a men's professional league team in 2001, as an assistant coach for the now defunct Greenville Groove of the National Basketball Development League (the minor league of the National Basketball Association). 
Margaret C. Wilmoth, United States Army Reserve, was promoted to Brigadier General, becoming the first nurse and first woman to command a medical brigade as a general officer. 
2002
January 15 - Nancy Pelosi became the first woman elected House whip, making her the first woman to hold such a position in either chamber of U.S. Congress. 
Melanie Wood was the first American woman and the second woman overall named a Putnam Fellow.
2003 
January 3 - Nancy Pelosi became the first woman elected House floor leader and minority leader, making her the first woman to lead a major political party in either chamber of U.S. Congress.
2005
Danica Patrick was the first woman to lead the Indianapolis 500.
Rosa Parks was the first woman to lie in honor in the Capitol.Memorial or Funeral Services in the Capitol Rotunda, senate.gov (United States Senate); content cited to Architect of the Capitol. Retrieved November 23, 2011.
2006
Effa Manley was the first woman inducted into the National Baseball Hall of Fame and Museum.
2007
January 4 - Nancy Pelosi became the first woman elected to serve as Speaker of the United States House of Representatives.
2008

Hillary Clinton was the first woman to win a major American party's presidential primary for the purposes of delegate selection when she won the primary in New Hampshire on January 8. (Shirley Chisholm's prior "win" in New Jersey in 1972 was in a no-delegate-awarding, presidential preference ballot that the major candidates were not listed in and that the only other candidate who was listed had already withdrawn from; the actual delegate selection vote went to George McGovern.)
Danica Patrick was the first woman to win an IndyCar Series by winning the 2008 Indy Japan 300. 
Sarah Palin was the first female vice presidential nominee of the Republican Party.
Ann E. Dunwoody was the first female four-star general in the U.S. Army.
The New Hampshire Senate became the first state legislative body to hold a majority of female members (13 out of 24). 
2009
January 3 - Jeanne Shaheen became the first woman to hold the offices of U.S. Senator and state Governor, being elected as governor of New Hampshire from 1997 to 2003 and U.S. senator for New Hampshire since 2009.
January 21 - Hillary Clinton was the first former First Lady of the United States to serve in a presidential cabinet; she appointed Secretary of State under President Barack Obama.
January 21 - Janet Napolitano became the first woman to serve as Secretary of Homeland Security; she served under President Barack Obama.
Kathryn Bigelow was the first woman to win the Directors Guild of America Award for Outstanding Directing, for The Hurt Locker (2008). 
Elinor Ostrom was the first woman to win the Nobel Prize in Economics, and since she was American, the first American woman to do so; she shared the prize with Oliver E. Williamson.
Nancy Lieberman became the coach of the Texas Legends in the NBA Development League, an affiliate of the Dallas Mavericks, thus making her the first woman to coach a professional men's basketball team. 
Kathleen O'Loughlin was the first female executive director of the American Dental Association.

2010s
2010
Nikki Haley was the first female governor of South Carolina and the first person of an ethnic minority to serve as governor of South Carolina.
Kathryn Bigelow was the first woman to win the Academy Award,  the BAFTA Award, and the Critics' Choice Award for Best Director, all for  The Hurt Locker'' (2008).
Jennifer Gorovitz was the first woman to lead a large Jewish federation in America (specifically, the Jewish Community Federation, based in San Francisco). 
2011
Angella Reid was the first female White House Chief Usher.
Kamala Harris was the first woman Attorney General of California. 
2012
February 2 - Elizabeth MacDonough was the first female appointed as Parliamentarian of the United States Senate.
Janet Wolfenbarger was the first female four-star general in the U.S. Air Force.
Katy Perry was the first female artist in history to have five consecutive number one singles on the Billboard Hot 100 from one album, thus awarding her with the Billboard Spotlight Award.
Shannon Eastin was the first woman to officiate a National Football League game in a pre-season matchup between the Green Bay Packers and the San Diego Chargers.
New Hampshire elects the first all-woman congressional delegation in U.S. history, with U.S. senators Jeanne Shaheen and Kelly Ayotte and U.S. representatives Carol Shea-Porter and Ann McLane Kuster. 
2013
 Irina Krush was the first female American to hold the title of Grandmaster.
Danica Patrick was the first woman to win a pole in the Daytona 500 and a NASCAR Monster Energy Cup Series race.
Danica Patrick was the first woman to lead the Daytona 500. 
Rosie Napravnik rode the filly Unlimited Budget to a 6th place finish in the 2013 Belmont, becoming the first woman to ride all three Triple Crown races in the same year.
Davie Jane Gilmour was the first woman to lead the Board of Directors for Little League.
Ashley Freiberg was the first woman to claim an overall GT3 Cup Challenge victory in North America, winning the Porsche IMSA GT3 Cup Challenge.
UFC 157, which took place in February, featured not only the first women's fight in UFC history but also the first UFC event headlined by two female fighters (Ronda Rousey and Liz Carmouche).
Rabbi Deborah Waxman was elected as the President of the Reconstructionist Rabbinical College. As the President, she is believed to have been the first woman and first lesbian to lead a Jewish congregational union, and the first female rabbi and first lesbian to lead a Jewish seminary; RRC is both a congregational union and a seminary.
Julia Morgan was the first woman to receive the American Institute of Architects' Gold Medal, which she received posthumously. 
On March 1, 2013, Privateers owner and president Nicole Kirnan served as the team's coach for the first time, making her the first woman to coach a professional hockey team in the United States.
Erika Schmidt was the first female director of the Chicago Institute for Psychoanalysis.
Mia Hamm was the first woman inducted into the World Football Hall of Fame in Pachuca, Mexico.
General Motors named Mary Barra as its first female CEO and the first female CEO of a major automaker.
Deborah Rutter was named as the first female president of the Kennedy Center.
Jodi Eller was the first woman to complete the 1,515 mile Florida Circumnavigational Saltwater Paddling Trail. 
The American Council of the Blind (ACB) voted unanimously to elect Kim Charlson as its president, making her the first female president of a major national blindness consumer advocacy organization in the United States.
Lauren Silberman was the first woman to try out at an NFL Regional Scouting Combine, and thus the first woman to try out for the NFL (she tried out as a kicker), but she did not succeed.
Vanessa O'Brien became the first woman to climb the highest peak on each continent (The Seven Summits) in the shortest period of time (295 days), resulting in a Guinness World Record.
2014

February 3 - Janet Yellen became the first woman to serve as Chair of the Federal Reserve.
The first women competed in ski jumping at the Olympics, including three American women - Lindsey Van, Jessica Jerome and Sarah Hendrickson.
Lauryn Williams was the first American woman to win a medal in both the Summer and Winter Olympic games.
Jennifer Welter was the first woman non-kicker or placekick-holder to play in a men's pro football game; she played running back for the Texas Revolution.
Michelle J. Howard began her assignment as the U.S. Navy's first female and first female African-American four-star admiral on July 1, 2014.
Michele A. Roberts was elected as the new Executive Director of the National Basketball Players Association, thus making her the first woman elected to the highest position of a major U.S. sport's players association.
 During the two-week 2014 NBA Summer League in Las Vegas, Natalie Nakase was an assistant coach for the Clippers, becoming the first woman to sit on the bench as an NBA assistant.
Becky Hammon became the first full-time female coach in the NBA - and the first full-time female coach in any of the four major professional sports in America - as an assistant coach for the San Antonio Spurs.
Anne B. France won the inaugural Landmark Award for Outstanding Contributions to NASCAR. 
Katie Higgins was the first female pilot to join the Blue Angels, the U.S. Navy's flight demonstration squadron.
Dr. Connie McCaa became the first American woman and the first Mississippi doctor inducted into the American Academy of Ophthalmology's Hall of Fame.
Suzy Whaley became the first female officer in the PGA, as PGA secretary.
Susan Morrison was named as the first female executive pastry chef at the White House.
Megan Smith was named as the first female Chief Technology Officer of the United States.
Megan Brennan was named as the first female United States Postmaster General.
2015
Jennifer Welter became the first American woman hired to coach in men's pro football when the Texas Revolution of the Champions Indoor Football league announced that Welter was hired to coach linebackers and special teams.
The U.S. Senate confirmed Michelle K. Lee as the Under Secretary of Commerce for Intellectual Property and Director of the United States Patent and Trademark Office (USPTO). Lee is the first woman and the first person of color to lead the USPTO.
Yumi Hogan became the first Korean American first lady of a U.S. state and the first Asian-American first lady in the history of Maryland.
 2016
Taylor Swift became the first woman to win Album of the Year twice.
July 26 - Hillary Clinton was formally nominated at the 2016 Democratic National Convention in Philadelphia, becoming the first woman nominated for president by a major U.S. political party.
Hillary Clinton became the first woman to win the popular vote in a United States presidential election and one of the two first women to receive an electoral vote for president.
Carla Hayden became the first female Librarian of Congress.
Kellyanne Conway became the first woman to run a successful presidential campaign.
Faith Spotted Eagle became the first Native American and one of the two first women to receive an electoral vote for president, which she received from a faithless elector. 
 General Lori Robinson became the first female officer to command a major Unified Combatant Command in the history of the US Armed Forces.
 Adena Friedman became the first female CEO of NASDAQ.
 2017
 Peggy Whitson broke the record for most total days spent in space by any NASA astronaut.
 Danica Patrick became the first woman to lead the Coca-Cola 600.
 Vanessa O'Brien became the first woman to summit K2, the second tallest mountain, at 28,251 feet.
 2018
Oprah Winfrey became the first African American woman to receive the Golden Globe Cecil B. DeMille Award  
Gina Haspel became the first woman to be Director of the Central Intelligence Agency.
Stacey Cunningham became the first female President of the New York Stock Exchange.
 Ellie Morrison became the first woman elected National Commissioner of the Boy Scouts of America; likewise, she became the first woman to hold a position in the BSA's "Key Three", consisting of the National Commissioner, the Chief Scout Executive, and the National Chair.
Carla Provost became the first female chief of the United States Border Patrol on August 9, 2018.
Deb Haaland of New Mexico and Sharice Davids of Kansas became the first Native American women to be elected to Congress.
Rashida Tlaib of Michigan and Ilhan Omar of Minnesota became the first Muslim women to be elected to Congress.
Martha McSally of Arizona became the first female senator who was appointed to Congress after losing an election to a future Senate colleague, and also the first to serve alongside someone who defeated her in the election prior to inauguration.
 2019
January 3 - Nancy Pelosi became the first woman elected to serve as Speaker of the United States House of Representatives  for non-consecutive terms.
Ghazala Hashmi became the first Muslim woman elected to the Senate of Virginia.
Carolyn Kindle Betz was among the first female-majority owners (i.e. Major League Soccer investors) to be awarded an MLS franchise, eventually named St. Louis City SC.

2020s

 2020

Billie Eilish became the first woman to win all four General Field categories in one ceremony at the 62nd Annual Grammy Awards on January 26, 2020. 
August 19 - Kamala Harris of California was formally nominated by the 2020 Democratic National Convention as the Democratic candidate for vice president of the United States, becoming the first woman of color, the first African American, the first Asian American, the first person of South Asian descent, the first person of Indian ancestry, and the first person of Jamaican ancestry to be nominated on a major party ticket.
 Ruth Bader Ginsburg became the first woman to lie in repose at the Supreme Court Building on September 23 and, the following day, became the first woman to lie in repose there for a second day.
On September 25, Ruth Bader Ginsburg lay in state at the Capitol, becoming the first woman to do so.
November 7 - Kamala Harris became the first woman elected as Vice President of the United States.
November 28 - Sarah Fuller became the first woman to play in a Power 5 football game.
December 30 - Becky Hammon became the first female acting head coach in NBA history.
2021
January 20 - Kamala Harris inaugurated as the first woman to serve as Vice President of the United States, making her the most powerful woman in America's political history, first in the line of succession to the US Presidency. 
January 20 - Kamala Harris became the first woman President of the United States Senate in U.S. history.
Janruary 20 - Jill Biden became the first non-Catholic First Lady married to a Catholic President.
January 21 - Avril Haines became the first woman to serve as Director of National Intelligence; she served under President Joe Biden.
January 26 - Janet Yellen became the first woman to serve as Secretary of the Treasury; she served under President Joe Biden.
November 19 - Kamala Harris became the first woman to serve as Acting President of the United States in American history.

See also 

History of the United States
History of women in the United States
Timeline of women in the United States
Timeline of women hazzans in America
Timeline of women in dentistry in America
Timeline of women in mathematics in America
Timeline of women rabbis in America
Women's education in the United States
Women's History Sites (U.S. National Park Service)
Women's suffrage in the United States
Women in the military by country § United States

Notes

References

Further reading

External links 

 History of American Women

History of women in the United States
Lists of firsts
Women's Firsts
firsts